Krabčice is a municipality and village in Litoměřice District in the Ústí nad Labem Region of the Czech Republic. It has about 900 inhabitants.

Administrative parts
Villages of Rovné and Vesce are administrative parts of Krabčice.

Geography

It lies in the Lower Eger Table, in the Polabí lowlands.

History
The first written mention of Krabčice is from 1226, when Matěj and Václav Nemoj from the Vršovci family gave the land to the monastery in Doksany. However, it was taken away from Doksany by Emperor Sigismund in order to assign it as a pledge to the Lords Rous of Svinov. At the end of the 16th century, it was purchased by William of Rosenberg. Then it was acquired by the Lobkowicz family, who owned it until 1850.

Demographics

Sights

The Evangelic church is a Pseudo-Renaissance building from 1885.

References

External links

Villages in Litoměřice District